Palazzo Orsi Mangelli is a Baroque architecture palace in Forlì, Italy.

It previously housed the University of Bologna faculty of Political Science. In 2015 it housed the headquarters of Luxury Living Group, a company in the design and furniture.

Orsi
Baroque architecture in Bologna